Charles Gardner may refer to:

Charles Gardner (botanist) (1896–1970), Australian botanist 
Charles Gardner (Australian cricketer) (1908–2001), Australian cricketer
Charles Gardner (South African cricketer) (1913–2001), South African cricketer
Charles Gardner (politician) (1828–1917), politician from Minnesota Territory
Charles Gardner (Medal of Honor) (1844–1895), German-born Indian Wars Medal of Honor recipient
Charles J. Gardner (1843–1901), American politician from New York
Charles N. Gardner (1845–1919), American Civil War soldier and Medal of Honor recipient
Alfred Charles Gardner (1880–1952), Scottish engineer
Charles Bruce-Gardner (1887–1960), English industrialist
Charles Gardner Radbourn (1854–1897), American professional baseball pitcher 
Bertie Charles Gardner (1884–1972), British-Canadian banker
Charles Gairdner (1898–1983), British Army general
Charles Gardner Geyh, law professor at Indiana University
Dick Gardner (1913–1997), real name Charles, English footballer

See also

Charles Gardiner (disambiguation)
Gardner (surname)